Eriophyllum wallacei is a North American flowering plant in the family Asteraceae known by the common names woolly daisy and woolly easterbonnets. It grows in the southwestern United States (Arizona, Utah, Nevada, and California, with an isolated population in Wyoming) and northwestern Mexico (northern Baja California). It may grow in clumps or on short erect stems in sand, rocks, and gravel.

The seed is black and narrow.

In drier conditions, the plant tends to grow a single stem to ensure its reproduction via seed. With more moisture, it branches from the base into multiple stalks.

References

External links

Jepson Manual Treatment
United States department of Agriculture Plants Profile
Calphotos Photo gallery, University of California

wallacei
Flora of the Southwestern United States
Flora of California
Flora of Baja California
Flora of the California desert regions
Natural history of the California chaparral and woodlands
Natural history of the Mojave Desert
Natural history of the Peninsular Ranges
Natural history of the Transverse Ranges
Plants described in 1857
Taxa named by Asa Gray
Flora without expected TNC conservation status